

See also 
 List of Catalan-language television channels

References 

Catalan
Catalan-language radio stations